Hindsight Records is an American record label that specializes in issuing previously unreleased radio broadcast recordings of Big Bands and Jazz artists.

History
Hindsight Records was founded by Big Band aficionado, recording engineer and studio owner Wally Heider, who built the label's initial catalog by obtaining Big Band radio broadcast recordings from the 1940s that had never been commercially released, along with agreements with the artists or their estates for permission to release the recordings.

In the 1970s and 1980s, Hindsight released over 100 albums, including performances by Duke Ellington, Jimmy Dorsey, Harry James, Stan Kenton, Mildred Bailey, Artie Shaw, and Woody Herman.
For liner notes, Hindsight hired music historians such as Brad McCuen and Irving Townsend.

In 1979 Thomas Gramuglia of the Michelex Corporation bought the Hindsight catalog. Through Heider, Hindsight owned over 9,000 copyrights and masters.

Jazz roster

References 

American record labels
Jazz record labels